The 2012 FAI Senior Challenge Cup, also known as the 2012 FAI Ford Senior Cup, was the 92nd season of the national football competition of the Republic of Ireland. The winners of the competition earned spots in both the second qualifying round of the 2013-14 UEFA Europa League and the 2013 Setanta Sports Cup.

A total of 40 team competed in the 2012 competition, which commenced on the weekend ending on 1 April 2012. The teams entered from the 2012 League of Ireland Premier Division and First Division received byes into the second round stage. Four non-league clubs also received byes to the second round. The remaining 12 teams entered at the first round stage. These teams are composed of the sixteen clubs, which reached the fourth round of the 2011–12 FAI Intermediate Cup. The cup was won by Derry City.

Teams

Calendar
The calendar for the 2012 FAI Cup, as announced by Football Association of Ireland.

First round
The draw for this round was conducted by FAI President Paddy McCaul and former player and 7-time winner Mick Neville at the FAI headquarters in Abbotstown on 6 March 2011. 16 of the 20 non-League of Ireland clubs are participating in this round, with the remaining 4 clubs earning a bye to the second round. The matches were played on the weekend ending 1 April 2012.

Second round
The draw for this round was conducted by FAI President Paddy McCaul at the FAI headquarters in Abbotstown on 30 April 2012. The 8 winners from the first round are joined by Blarney United, Drumkeen United, Everton AFC, St. Patrick's CY, which received byes for the first round, and the 20 League of Ireland clubs. The matches were played on the weekend ending 27 May 2012.

Second round Replays

Third round
The draw for the third round was made on 16 July on Monday Night Soccer. The draw was conducted with only 15 clubs due to the exit of Monaghan United from senior football. St. Patrick's Athletic were first drawn out and therefore received a bye.

Quarter-finals
The draw for the quarter-finals was made on 27 August on Monday Night Soccer. Fixtures took place on the weekend of 16 September 2012.

Quarter-finals replays

Semifinals
The draw for the semifinals was made on 17 September on Monday Night Soccer. Fixtures took place on the weekend of 7 October 2012.

Semi-finals replays

Final

External links
 Official competition website

References

 
2012
2